Brezovica pri Trebelnem is a small settlement in the Municipality of Mokronog-Trebelno in southeastern Slovenia. It lies in the hills south of Mokronog. The area is part of the historical region of Lower Carniola. The municipality is now included in the Southeast Slovenia Statistical Region.

Name
The name of the settlement was changed from Brezovica to Brezovica pri Trebelnem in 1953.

Church
The local church in the settlement is dedicated to Saint Anne and belongs to the Parish of Mokronog. It was first mentioned in written documents dating to 1526 and was restyled in the Baroque in the mid-18th century. The main altar dates to 1776.

References

External links
Brezovica pri Trebelnem on Geopedia

Populated places in the Municipality of Mokronog-Trebelno